is a former Japanese football player.
He had experience for Japan at U18, U19 and U20 levels, but was released by Avispa Fukuoka at the end of the 2010 season.

Club statistics

References

External links

1989 births
Living people
Association football people from Fukuoka Prefecture
Japanese footballers
J2 League players
Avispa Fukuoka players
Renofa Yamaguchi FC players
Association football forwards